Mathematical Notes is a peer-reviewed mathematical journal published by Springer Science+Business Media on behalf of the Russian Academy of Sciences that covers all aspects of mathematics. It is an English language translation of the Russian-language journal Matematicheskie Zametki and is published simultaneously with the Russian version.

The journal was established in 1967 as Mathematical Notes of the Academy of Sciences of the USSR and obtained its current title in 1991. The current editor-in-chief is Victor P. Maslov. According to the Journal Citation Reports, the journal has a 2011 impact factor of 0.295.

References

External links
 

Mathematics journals
Springer Science+Business Media academic journals
Monthly journals
English-language journals
Publications established in 1967
Russian Academy of Sciences academic journals
Russian-language journals